Ligia is a female given name. Notable people with the name include:

Given names

Athletes
Lígia Costa (born 1996), Brazilian handballer
Ligia Grozav (born 1994), Romanian athlete
Ligia Moreira (born 1992) Ecuadorean footballer
Lígia Silva (born 1981), Brazilian table tennis player

Arts and literature
Ligia Amadio, Brazilian conductor
Ligia Maura Costa, Brazilian professor
Ligia Hernández (born 1985), Venezuelan model
Ligia Montoya (1920-1967), Argentinian artist
Ligia Petit (born 1981), Venezuelan model and actress

Other
Ligia B. Bieliukas (1923-1966), Lithuanian clubwoman
Ligia Bonetti (born 1968), Dominican businesswoman
Lígia Fonseca (born 1963), Cape Verdean lawyer
Ligia Gargallo, Chilean chemist

Middle names
Ana Ligia Fabian (born 1988), Dominican volleyballplayer
Ana Ligia Mixco Sol de Saca (born 1961), Salvadorean businesswoman and first lady

Telenovelas
Ligia Elena, 1982 Venezuelan telenovela
Ligia Sandoval, 1981 Venezuelan telenovela

See also 

 Lygia (given name)
 Ligeia (disambiguation)
 Ligia
Ligiah Villalobos

Feminine given names